Rush–Henrietta Senior High School - James E. Sperry Building, located in Henrietta, New York, also referred to as Rush–Henrietta Senior High School, R-H and Sperry High School, is the only high school in the Rush-Henrietta Central School District. As of the 2021–22 school year, the principal is Dr. Timothy Shafer.

Beginning with the class of 2004, students in the ninth grade in the Rush-Henrietta district began attending the Ninth Grade Academy (the Carlton Webster building). This move was made in response to an overcrowding of students at the Senior High building. The building is a short distance from the high school. However, as of the 2017–18 school year, the Webster Building is now in use as an alternative high school, and ninth-graders attend one of the two junior high schools.

Rush-Henrietta has a strong athletic program with dozens of varsity teams. The school is known to be arch rivals with the Red Raiders of the nearby Fairport Central School District, located in Fairport, New York.

Sports facilities

The Senior High School has a wide array of sports facilities. This includes a football stadium with two sets of bleacher stands and an 8-lane track surrounding the field. The grounds also contain six fully caged and standard regulation tennis courts, three baseball diamonds, and three soccer/lacrosse fields.

Inside, an indoor pool features a diving well as standard lap lanes. The school allows time for open swim where any resident of the Rush-Henrietta community may use the pool. A relatively recent renovation added two additional full size basketball courts to the existing one, as well as various space for other sports such as ping pong, volleyball and other net sports.

Expansion
Under the direction of then Superintendent of Schools Ken Graham, the school added on a $15 million gym complex, as well as extensive remodeling to the sports fields located on the campus. This expansion also added eight new classrooms to the academic structure of the building. The expansion also added a senior lounge to the building. The expansion also added a new Literacy Center adjacent to the Senior Lounge. The expansion also added new parking lot space. The expansion was under the supervision of The Rush-Henrietta Central School District. The expansion was completed in September 2014.

Notable alumni
 Blaise Faggiano - head college football coach at Utica College and former defensive coordinator at St. John Fisher College.
 Desmond Green - NY State Champion wrestler; current Mixed Martial Artist
Mike Nguyen - Class of 1984, is a Vietnamese-American artist who worked as a Supervising Animator on Warner Bros.' The Iron Giant but is most famous for his own animated feature My Little World. Mike Nguyen received his BFA in character animation at the California Institute of the Arts in 1988. Since then, he has worked in the feature animation film industry for over 10 years as an animator, for major studios such as Disney, DreamWorks, and Warner Bros.
 Shenise Johnson - Class of 2008, Professional Women's Basketball player (WNBA) for the Indiana Fever.
Miranda Melville - Class of 2007, 2016 US Olympic Women's Track and Field Team Member
 Dane Miller Jr. - Class of 2009, Professional basketball player who has played in the Basketball Africa League (BAL).

References

https://en.wikipedia.org/wiki/Shenise_Johnson

External links
Rush-Henrietta Senior High School website

1992 establishments in New York (state)
Educational institutions established in 1992
High schools in Monroe County, New York
Public high schools in New York (state)